Valentina Massi (born 23 April 1983 in Forlimpopoli, Emilia-Romagna, Italy) is the winner of the Miss Universo Italia 2007 pageant that was held at the Teatro Giacosa in Ivrea, Piedmont on 21 April 2007. She represented Italy at the Miss Universe 2007 pageant in Mexico City on 28 May.

In 2000 she entered the Miss Italia pageant where she was a finalist. In 2006 she entered the Miss Mondo Italia pageant (which selects the Italian delegate who will compete at Miss World) as Miss Mondo Romagna. She was a finalist there as well and won the Miss Model national sash.

Valentina stands  and she's a Taurus. She speaks English and French

References

External links
 .

1983 births
Living people
People from Forlimpopoli
Miss Universe 2007 contestants
Italian female models
Italian beauty pageant winners